The fourth season of New Zealand reality television series The Block NZ, titled The Block NZ: Villa Wars, premiered on 29 September 2015, with the final episode airing on 7 December 2015. It was set on the boundaries of the Auckland suburbs of Sandringham and Three Kings. The prize money for achieving the most profit from the auction was raised to $100,000 for this series.

Contestants

Score history

Room reveals

Auction

Notes

Episodes

References

2015 New Zealand television seasons